Thomas Buffum (1776 – May 19, 1852) was a justice of the Rhode Island Supreme Court from May 1819 to May 1823.

A native of Smithfield, Rhode Island, In addition to his judicial service, Buffum was elected as a Democrat to both houses of the Rhode Island General Assembly.

In his religious affiliation, he was a member of the Society of Friends. Buffum died at his home in Smithfield at the age of 76.

References

1776 births
1852 deaths
People from Smithfield, Rhode Island
Democratic Party members of the Rhode Island House of Representatives
Democratic Party Rhode Island state senators
Justices of the Rhode Island Supreme Court
American Quakers